Derallus altus is a species of water scavenger beetle in the family Hydrophilidae. It is found in the Caribbean, North America, and South America.

References

Hydrophilinae
Articles created by Qbugbot
Beetles described in 1855